The Hungarians in Austria numbers 25,884 according to the 2001 Census. Of these, 10,686 were in Vienna and 4,704 in Burgenland. The total number of Hungarian-speakers is estimated at around 40,000, with 6,600 in Burgenland. Most of the Burgenland Hungarians live near the two district capitals of Oberwart/Felsőőr and Oberpullendorf/Felsőpulya. The Hungarian Group Advisory Council is the oldest of the official minority advisory councils in Austria.

History
Hungarians of Burgenland are the descendants of frontier guards sent during the eleventh century to protect the Kingdom of Hungary. Burgenland place names contain the elements 'Schützen' or 'Wart' ( as in Obserschützen, Unterwart etc.) constituting the linguistic testimony of that historic period. (In the following centuries many of these early inhabitants assimilated into the German-speaking population of Western Hungary.) Hungarians had maintained their privileged status until 1848. Burgenland was under Hungarian rule until the 1920 Treaty of Trianon. Hungarian education continued in the interwar period in a number of municipalities. Economic decline in Burgenland after World War II led to emigration. The negative image (see Iron Curtain) of the Hungarian language by this time led to assimilation.

As a result of the recognition of the Viennese Hungarians (1992) as a part of the Hungarian minority, the Hungarian minority is composed of two parts, namely the Burgenland Hungarians and the Hungarians living in the Vienna region.

Viennese Hungarians

Hungarians established a community in Vienna from 1541 following the 1526 battle of Mohács. Towards the end of the 17th century the city became a key cultural center for Hungarians. Hungarian students graduated from the Vienna University and from the 17th century onwards there was an increasing influx of Hungarian craftsmen into Vienna. The first cultural associations were set up in Vienna in the 1860s. 130,300 residents of Vienna in 1910 were citizens of the Hungarian part of the empire, while only 45,000 of them were also ethnically Hungarians. After World War I a re-emigration started. In censuses of the Interwar period Hungarians counted between 1,000-2,000 people. Refugees from Hungary increased the numbers again in 1945, 1948 and 1956. Today, some 27,000 Hungarians live in Vienna.

Burgenland Hungarians
The Hungarians of Burgenland were split into four groups prior to the 1921 annexation of Burgenland:

 Seewinkel region (Neusiedl District)
 District municipalities including the future capital Eisenstadt
 Oberpullendorf and Mitterpullendorf
 The (Obere) Wart with the settlements of Oberwart and Unterwart as well as Siget in der Wart.

The first two groups were largely absorbed after World War II, especially as a result of industrialisation after 1955. When German was introduced as the official language, Hungarian was only used on a rather restricted level, mostly spoken within the family. In the post-war school system Hungarian was taught as a foreign language for 2–3 hours per week even in communities with a Hungarian majority.

Religion
Two-thirds of Hungarians in Burgenland were Roman Catholic in 2004; Lutheran and Calvinist communities are also notable.

Notable people

See also 
 Austria–Hungary relations
 Hungarian diaspora 
 Immigration to Austria

Footnotes

References

External links 
 Hungarian Cultural Fellowship in Burgenland 
 Bécsi Napló Magazine for Hungarians in Austria 

 
Austria
Hungarian
Social history of Austria
11th century in Hungary
Austria
Austria–Hungary relations